Franjo Majetić (26 February 1923 – 29 November 1991) was a Croatian actor noted for his comedic roles.

Although predominantly a stage actor, he is best remembered for his film debut - at age 47 - in the classic 1970 comedy One Song a Day Takes Mischief Away.

In November 2005 Majetić was ranked #10 in «Best Croatian Male Movie Stars of All Time» list by a Croatian-based monthly film magazine Hollywood.

References

External links

1923 births
1991 deaths
Croatian male film actors
Croatian male stage actors
Croatian male television actors
Male actors from Zagreb
20th-century Croatian male actors
Yugoslav male actors